Isotenes miserana (orange fruit borer) is a species of moth of the family Tortricidae. It is found in the Northern Territory, Queensland, New South Wales and Victoria. This species has been introduced to New Zealand.

The wingspan is about 20 mm.

The larvae are considered a pest for flowers and fruit of a wide variety of agricultural plants and fruit trees, including Citrus sinensis, Persea americana, Macadamia integrifolia, Litchi chinensis, Vitis vinifera and Morus species.

References

Moths described in 1863
Moths of Australia
Archipini